Jürgen Erich Schrempp (born September 15, 1944, in Freiburg) was the CEO of Daimler-Benz from May 1995 to December 31, 2005, which became DaimlerChrysler, a German-American car and truck manufacturer. Following a decision of the board taken on July 28, 2005, he was succeeded on January 1, 2006, by Chrysler frontman Dieter Zetsche. Schrempp was the architect of the merger joint venture between Daimler Benz and Chrysler, which ultimately ended in failure when Chrysler was sold in 2007.

Career 
During his tenure, Daimler-Benz made the 80% acquisition of the Chrysler Corporation to become DaimlerChrysler. Schrempp called the merger a "match made in heaven". In addition to the acquisition of Chrysler, Schrempp pursued the acquisition of Mitsubishi Motors as part of his 'Three Pillars' strategy to expand the reach of Daimler-Benz into the major markets of the United States and Asia.

In 2004, the Mitsubishi investment became a liability with the Japanese manufacturer swamped under a mountain of debt and following a refusal by other members of the Japanese Mitsubishi keiretsu to assist Daimler in funding its operation. The German company eventually walked away with substantial losses. On 14 May 2007, Daimler sold 80% of Chrysler to the private equity firm Cerberus.

Before becoming the CEO of Daimler-Benz in 1995, Schrempp headed the aerospace division of Daimler-Benz, then called DASA, which is EADS today. DASA acquired the Dutch aircraft manufacturer Fokker that was already in difficulty in 1993 after it signed a contract stating the intention to take Fokker over on October 30, 1992. Schrempp called Fokker his "love baby". On January 22, 1996, after having subsidized the losses of Fokker with billions of Deutsche Marks, Daimler-Benz decided to stop putting more money into Fokker, and the firm subsequently went bankrupt.

Schrempp is a Director of South African Coal, Oil and Gas Corporation Ltd., and Compagnie Financière Richemont S.A., Switzerland. Additional engagements include the Chairmanship of United Global Academy - UGA, the advisory board of Deutsche Bank, the European Advisory Board of Harvard Business School, and the German Council of INSEAD. He is also on the board of Transnet.

He was previously a non-executive director of Vodafone Group plc, after their 2000 take over of Mannesman Group. He is a former member of the Steering Committee of the Bilderberg Group.

Recognition 
Schrempp is the recipient of:
 Cross of the Order of Merit of the Federal Republic of Germany
 Bavarian Order of Merit
 Medal of Merit of the Federal State of Baden-Württemberg
 Commander of the National Order of Merit of the French Republic
 Commander of the French Legion of Honour
 The Vatican City’s Cross of the St. Gregorius Order
 Austrian Grand Decoration of Honor in Gold with Star for Services
 Brazilian Southern Cross.
 Woodrow Wilson Award for Corporate Citizenship
 Commander of the Order of Good Hope

Personal life 

Schrempp lives primarily in Munich, Germany and Kitzbuehel Austria where his wife, Lydia Schrempp, owns an Italian restaurant. He has been married to Lydia since 2000, with whom he has a daughter, Loana Theresa, (born in 2001) and a son, Luca-Timon, (born in 2005). Schrempp has two sons, Alexander and Marc, from his previous marriage to Renate Lutz, which was ended by Lutz due to Schremp's adulterous affair with Lydia, who was his secretary at the time.

References

External links 
 Dutch Wikipedia :nl:Fokker 30 July 2005
 Daimler's nose dive: After reporting Germany's worst loss ever, the company dumps Dutch planemaker Fokker as diversification fails article in TIME International February 5, 1996 Volume 147, No. 6

Recipients of the Cross of the Order of Merit of the Federal Republic of Germany
Recipients of the Order of Merit of Baden-Württemberg
Members of the Steering Committee of the Bilderberg Group
Chrysler executives
Mercedes-Benz Group executives
DaimlerChrysler
Harvard Business School people
1944 births
Living people
Businesspeople from Freiburg im Breisgau
Automotive businesspeople
Chrysler people
Daimler people